Waleed Ahmed (born 4 December 1992) is a Pakistani cricketer. He made his List A debut for Karachi Whites in the 2018–19 Quaid-e-Azam One Day Cup on 6 September 2018. He was the leading wicket-taker for Karachi Whites in the tournament, with ten dismissals in five matches.

He made his first-class debut for Karachi Whites in the 2018–19 Quaid-e-Azam Trophy on 8 September 2018. In March 2019, he was named in Punjab's squad for the 2019 Pakistan Cup. In September 2019, he was named in Sindh's squad for the 2019–20 Quaid-e-Azam Trophy tournament. He made his Twenty20 debut on 14 October 2019, for Sindh in the 2019–20 National T20 Cup.

References

External links
 

1992 births
Living people
Pakistani cricketers
Karachi Whites cricketers
Cricketers from Karachi